Rodney T. Smith (born 1947 in Washington, D.C.) is an American poet, fiction writer, and editor. The author of twelve poetry collections and a collection of short fiction, Smith is the editor of Shenandoah, a prestigious literary journal published by Washington and Lee University. His poetry and stories are identified with Southern literature and have been published in magazines and literary journals such as The Atlantic Monthly, Poetry, Southern Humanities Review, and The Kenyon Review.

Life 
Rodney T. Smith grew up in Georgia and North Carolina. Smith received his higher education at Georgia Tech, the University of North Carolina, and Appalachian State University. He now lives in Rockbridge County, Virginia.

Academic and editing career 

While at Appalachian State University, Smith founded Cold Mountain Review. He also taught for nineteen years as an English professor at Auburn University, where he was named an Alumni Writer-In-Residence.

At Auburn Smith co-edited Southern Humanities Review. He currently serves as editor of Shenandoah, a prestigious literary journal published by Washington and Lee University, where he also teaches creative writing and literature courses in the English Department.

He teaches poetry and fiction in the Low-Residency MFA program in Creative Writing at Converse College.

Awards 

Smith's writings have won the Pushcart Prize and been collected in Best American Short Stories and New Stories From the South. He has received fellowships from the National Endowment for the Arts, the North Carolina Arts Council, and the Alabama Council on the Arts (he also received the Alabama Governor's Award for Achievement by an Artist). Two of his poetry collections have been nominated for the Pulitzer Prize for Poetry. Other awards include the Library of Virginia Poetry Prize and the Maurice English Poetry Award.

Bibliography

Selected poetry collections

 Outlaw Style: Poems (Arkansas Poetry Series, 2007)
 The Hollow Log Lounge (University of Illinois Press, 2003). Winner of the 2004 Maurice English Poetry Award.
 Brightwood (Louisiana State University Press, 2003)
 Messenger (Louisiana State University Press, 2001). Winner of the Library of Virginia Poetry Prize.
 Split the Lark: Selected Poems (1999)
 Trespasser (1996). Nominated for the Pulitzer Prize for Poetry.
 Hunter-Gatherer (Livingston University Press, 1996)
 The Cardinal Heart (1991). Nominated for the Pulitzer Prize for Poetry.
 From the High Dive (1983)

Fiction

 Faith: Stories (Black Belt Press, 1995)
 Uke Rivers Delivers: Stories (Yellow Shoe Press, 2006)
 The Calaboose Epistles (Iris Press, 2009)

As editor

 Common Wealth: Contemporary Poets of Virginia (2003, with Sarah Kennedy).

References

External links 
 Shenandoah: The Washington and Lee University Review

American male poets
1947 births
Living people
Georgia Tech alumni
Washington and Lee University faculty
University of North Carolina at Chapel Hill alumni
Appalachian State University alumni
Auburn University faculty